House of Usher (also known as The Fall of the House of Usher) is a 1960 American horror film directed by Roger Corman and written by Richard Matheson from the 1839 short story "The Fall of the House of Usher" by Edgar Allan Poe. The film was the first of eight Corman/Poe feature films and stars Vincent Price, Myrna Fahey, Mark Damon and Harry Ellerbe.

In 2005, the film was listed with the United States National Film Registry as being deemed "culturally, historically, or aesthetically significant."

Plot
Philip Winthrop (Mark Damon) travels to the House of Usher, a desolate mansion surrounded by a murky swamp, to see his fiancée Madeline Usher (Myrna Fahey). Madeline's brother Roderick (Vincent Price) opposes Philip's intentions, telling the young man that the Usher family is afflicted by a cursed bloodline which has driven all their ancestors to madness and even affected the mansion itself, causing the surrounding countryside to become desolate. Roderick foresees the family evils being propagated into future generations with a marriage to Madeline and vehemently discourages the union. Philip becomes increasingly desperate to take Madeline away; desperate to get away from her brother, she agrees to leave with him.

During a heated argument with her brother, Madeline suddenly falls into catalepsy, a condition in which its sufferers appear dead; her brother—who knows that she is still alive—convinces Winthrop that she is dead and rushes to have her entombed in the family crypt beneath the house. As Philip is preparing to leave following the entombment, the butler, Bristol (Harry Ellerbe), lets slip that Madeline suffered from catalepsy.

Philip rips open Madeline's coffin and finds it empty. He desperately searches for her in the winding passages of the crypt but eventually collapses. Madeline revives inside her sealed coffin, goes insane from being buried alive, and breaks free. She confronts her brother and attacks him, throttling him to death. Suddenly the house, already aflame due to fallen coals from the fire, begins to collapse, and the two Ushers and Bristol are consumed by the falling house, ending the Usher bloodline. Philip alone escapes and watches the burning house sink into the swampy land surrounding it. The film ends with the final words of Poe's story: "... and the deep and dank tarn closed sullenly and silently over the fragments of the 'House of Usher'".

Cast
 Vincent Price as Roderick Usher
 Mark Damon as Philip Winthrop
 Myrna Fahey as Madeline Usher
 Harry Ellerbe as Bristol

Production

The film was important in the history of American International Pictures which up until then had specialized in making low budget black and white films to go out on double bills. The market for this kind of movie was in decline so AIP decided to gamble on making a larger budgeted film in color.

The film was announced in February 1959 and was dubbed the company's "most ambitious film to date".

A number of other companies announced Poe projects around this time: Alex Gordon had a version of Masque of the Red Death, Fox had Murders in the Rue Morgue, Ben Bogeus The Gold Bug, and Universal The Raven.

It was shot in 15 days. The budget was $300,000, $100,000 of which went to star Vincent Price. Production designer Daniel Haller purchased sets and props from Universal Studios for $2,500 and redressed them to create the Usher mansion. The misshapen trees seen on the Usher estate were actual trees which had burned in a fire in the Hollywood Hills. To depict the burning manse, Corman had two cameramen film the burning of a barn in Orange County.

House of Usher made $1 million in the summer of 1960.

Score
In February 2011 Intrada made the world premiere release of the Les Baxter score from music-only elements in mono.

Reception
Eugene Archer, in the September 15, 1960 edition of The New York Times wrote, "American-International, with good intentions of presenting a faithful adaption of Edgar Allan Poe's classic tale of the macabre...blithely ignored the author's style. Poe's prose style, as notable for ellipsis as imagery, compressed or eliminated the expository passages habitual to nineteenth-century fiction and invited the readers' imaginations to participate." He further opined, "Under the low-budget circumstances, Vincent Price and Myrna Fahey should not be blamed for portraying the decadent Ushers with arch affectation, nor Mark Damon held to account for the traces of Brooklynese that creep into his stiffly costumed impersonation of the mystified interloper."

Other reviewers have been kinder, however; a positive assessment in Variety declared, "It's not precisely the Edgar Allan Poe short story known to high school English that emerges in House of Usher, but it's a reasonably diverting and handsomely mounted variation ... The film has been mounted with care, skill and flair by producer-director Roger Corman and his staff." Harrison's Reports called it "fairly good entertainment. Although a bit too wordy, the abundant gore, photo gimmicks, special effects and unusual theme, help keep the viewer on his seat's edge." The Monthly Film Bulletin praised the film's "unusually resourceful" camerawork as well as "an excellent central performance" from Vincent Price, finding that although Corman's direction "does not suggest a great stylist in the making, he brings off the big scenes with some invention, as well as making the most of what was probably only a medium-sized budget." Betty Martin of the Los Angeles Times called it "a better than average horror film – if that's saying much", adding that Price "does a masterful job" in his role.

House of Usher has an 84% "fresh" rating on Rotten Tomatoes based on 50 reviews and a critics consensus: "Scary, strange, and maybe a little silly, House of Usher represents an early high mark for Vincent Price and a career triumph for director Roger Corman."

See also
 List of American films of 1960
The Corman-Poe cycle
Midnite Movies

References

Bibliography

External links

 

 House of Usher at MGM
 
House of Usher essay by Daniel Eagan in America's Film Legacy: The Authoritative Guide to the Landmark Movies in the National Film Registry, A&C Black, 2010 , pp. 565–66 

1960 films
1960 horror films
1960s English-language films
American International Pictures films
Films based on The Fall of the House of Usher
Films directed by Roger Corman
Films produced by Roger Corman
Films scored by Les Baxter
Films set in country houses
Gothic horror films
Films with screenplays by Richard Matheson
United States National Film Registry films
American psychological horror films
American exploitation films
1960s American films